United States v. Louisiana, 382 U.S. 288 (1965), was a case decided by the Supreme Court of the United States regarding the state of Louisiana's entitlement to the lands, minerals and other natural resources underlying the Gulf of Mexico.

See also
 List of United States Supreme Court cases, volume 382

External links

1965 in United States case law
Legal history of Louisiana
United States Supreme Court cases
United States Supreme Court cases of the Warren Court